Psammodromus occidentalis is a species of lizards in the family Lacertidae. It is endemic to Western Iberian Peninsula (western Spain and Portugal). Before being described as a distinct species in 2012, it was considered as the western lineage of P. hispanicus.

References

Psammodromus
Endemic fauna of the Iberian Peninsula
Lizards of Europe
Reptiles described in 2012
Taxa named by Patrick S. Fitze